Gustavo José Perla (born May 3, 1978 in Montevideo, Uruguay) is a former Uruguayan footballer who played for clubs of Uruguay, Argentina and Chile.

Teams
  Colón FC 1996-1998
  Deportivo Maldonado 1999-2007
  Juventud de Pergamino 2007
  Arturo Fernández Vial 2008-2009

References
 
 Gustavo Perla at playmakerstats.com (English version of ceroacero.es)
 

1978 births
Living people
Uruguayan footballers
Uruguayan expatriate footballers
Deportivo Maldonado players
C.D. Arturo Fernández Vial footballers
Primera B de Chile players
Expatriate footballers in Chile
Expatriate footballers in Argentina
Uruguayan expatriate sportspeople in Chile
Uruguayan expatriate sportspeople in Argentina
Association football goalkeepers